Stéphane Barin (born 8 January 1971) is a French former ice hockey player. He competed in the men's tournaments at the 1992, 1994, 1998 and the 2002 Winter Olympics.

References

External links

1971 births
Living people
Brûleurs de Loups players
Chamonix HC players
Gothiques d'Amiens players
Olympic ice hockey players of France
Ice hockey players at the 1992 Winter Olympics
Ice hockey players at the 1994 Winter Olympics
Ice hockey players at the 1998 Winter Olympics
Ice hockey players at the 2002 Winter Olympics
Krefeld Pinguine players
Ours de Villard-de-Lans players
People from Saint-Martin-d'Hères
Sportspeople from Isère
EC VSV players